Cletopsyllidae is a family of crustaceans belonging to the order Harpacticoida.

Genera:
 Bathycletopsyllus Huys & Lee, 1999
 Cletopsyllus Willey, 1935
 Isocletopsyllus Huys & Lee, 1999
 Pentacletopsyllus Bang, Baguley & Moon, 2014
 Pseudocletopsyllus Vervoort, 1964
 Retrocalcar Huys & Lee, 1999

References

Harpacticoida